Karlovac County is a county in central Croatia, with the administrative center in Karlovac.

The city of Karlovac is a fort from the times of the Military Frontier. It was built as a six-side star fort in the 16th century at the point of confluence of four rivers. The town blossomed in the 18th and 19th century after being made a free town, with the development of roads between Pannonian Basin to the Adriatic Sea, and waterways along the Kupa river. The city is making use of its crucial geostrategic point in Croatia.

The county itself extends towards the north to the water springs of Jamnica, and towards the south all the way down to the mountainous regions of Gorski Kotar and Lika, in particular to the Bjelolasica mountain which features the largest winter sport recreation center in the country.

Administrative division

Karlovac County is divided:

 City of Karlovac (county seat)
 City of Ogulin
 Town of Duga Resa
 Town of Ozalj
 Town of Slunj
 Municipality of Barilović
 Municipality of Bosiljevo
 Municipality of Cetingrad
 Municipality of Draganić
 Municipality of Generalski Stol
 Municipality of Josipdol
 Municipality of Kamanje
 Municipality of Krnjak
 Municipality of Lasinja
 Municipality of Netretić
 Municipality of Plaški
 Municipality of Rakovica
 Municipality of Ribnik
 Municipality of Saborsko
 Municipality of Tounj
 Municipality of Vojnić
 Municipality of Žakanje

Demographics

As of the 2011 census, the county had 128,899 residents. The population density is 36 people per km².

Ethnic Croats form the majority with 86.1% of the population, followed by Serbs at 10.4%.

County government
The current Prefect of Karlovac County is Martina Furdek-Hajdin (HDZ).

The county assembly is composed of 37 representatives from the following political parties:

See also
 Serbian Orthodox Eparchy of Gornji Karlovac
 Modruš-Rijeka County of the Kingdom of Croatia-Slavonia
 Serbs of Croatia
 List of people from Karlovac County

References

External links
 

 
Counties of Croatia